Oleg Alexandrovich Lavrentiev (in Pskov, Russia –  in Kharkiv in Ukraine) was a Soviet Russian and later Ukrainian physicist in the former Soviet program of nuclear weapons whose research contributions were fundamental to understanding of thermonuclear fusion.

Biography 
Lavrentiev was born in Pskov, into a family descended from peasants. His father, Alexander, completed 2 years at a parochial school, worked as a clerk at a Pskov factory, his mother, Alexandra, completed 4 years, and worked as a nurse.

During the war, at age 18 he volunteered for the front. He participated in the battles for the Baltic States (1944–1945), transferred to the Sakhalin Military District, and continued military service in Poronaisk. He was a self-taught physicist who once allowed to attend the Moscow State University but did not secure graduation from there. Eventually, the Kharkiv Institute of Physics and Technology awarded him the doctorate in 2004.

The hydrogen bomb and controlled fusion 

While in grade 7 (in 1941) upon reading "Introduction to Nuclear Physics", he showed interest in this topic. While in the military on Sakhalin Lavrentiev educated himself, using the library of technical literature and college textbooks. With his measly military allowance he subscribed to the journal Uspekhi Fizicheskikh Nauk. (Advances in Physical Science) In 1948, Lavrentiev was instructed to prepare a lecture on nuclear physics. With a few days to prepare, he had time to rethink the problem and wrote a letter to the Central Committee of the CPSU (b). From Moscow came an order to create for him an atmosphere where he could work. In a guarded room dedicated to him, he wrote his first article, which he sent in July 1950 via secret mail to the department of heavy equipment engineering of the Central Committee.

His proposal consisted of two parts. Firstly, he proposed an implementation of a hydrogen bomb, based on lithium deuteride. In the second part of his work, he describes how to obtain electricity from a controlled thermonuclear reaction. Andrei Sakharov reviewed his work and wrote in a review the following:

In 1950 Lavrentiev was demobilized from the army and came to Moscow, where he entered the Physics Department of Moscow State University. A few months later he was summoned to the Minister of the measuring instrument (the nuclear industry) V.A. Makhnev, and a few days later - to the Kremlin to the chairman of an ad hoc committee on atomic and hydrogen weapons, Lavrentiy Beria.

After meeting with Beria, Lavrentiev was given a room in the new house and a scholarship. He was allowed to attend lectures at will and to request on-demand delivery of scientific literature. He was assigned a math supervising professor PhD A.A. Samarskii (later - academician and Hero of Socialist Labor).

In May 1951, Lavrentiev got access to newly opened State program of fusion research. (Laboratory of instrumentation of the USSR, currently - Kurchatov Institute), where research was carried out on high temperature plasma physics classified as top-secret. There was already ongoing testing and development of Andrei Sakharov's and Igor Tamm's ideas for the fusion reactor. 
 
On August 12, 1953 the Soviet Union tested a thermonuclear warhead based on lithium deuteride. Unlike other participants in the development of new weapons that have received state awards and ranks, Lavrentiev was denied admission to the lab, and was forced to write a thesis project without access to the lab and without a scientific adviser. Nonetheless, he graduated with honors based on his theoretical work on controlled thermonuclear fusion.

In the spring of 1956 Lavrentiev was sent to Kharkiv Theoretical Physics School (KIPT, Kharkov, USSR), and presented his report on the theory of electromagnetic traps to the director of the Institute Cyril Sinelnikov. In 1958, KIPT built the first electromagnetic trap.

Restoring primacy 
In August 2001, the journal "Uspekhi Fizicheskikh Nauk" (Advances in physics science) published Lavrentiev's biography; his proposal that was mailed from Sakhalin, July 29, 1950; the review by Sakharov, and Beria's orders, which were kept in the Archives of the Russian Federation President designated as secret. That has reestablished the primacy of  his scientific achievement.

Notes

References 
 Valentine Gatash, Kharkov " top secret physicist Lavrentiev "/ / Proceedings of the science. 29.08.2003.
 Proposal OA Lavrent'ev, sent to the Central Committee of the CPSU (b) July 29, 1950
 Bondarenko BD "The role of OA Lavrent'ev in the formulation of the problem and initiate research on controlled thermonuclear fusion in the USSR "/ / UFN 171,  886 (2001).
The father of the hydrogen bomb - Oleg Lavrentiev.
My world - mail.ru
 

2011 deaths
1926 births
Theoretical physicists
Ukrainian nuclear physicists
Soviet nuclear physicists
Soviet military personnel of World War II